Alison McIntyre is the Virginia Onderdonk '29 Professor of Philosophy at Wellesley College. McIntyre received her bachelor's and master's degrees from Tufts University, before going on to receive a doctoral degree from Princeton.

Research areas and publications
McIntyre's research areas are varied, and include the philosophy of mind, moral theory, the history of moral philosophy, and 18th-century British moral psychology.  Her current research is focused on the debates surrounding moral motivation and judgment that took place in Scotland, England, and Ireland, in the 17th and 18th centuries.  McIntyre has also delved into issues of bioethics, specifically about the potential applications of the doctrine of double effect in end-of-life decision-making, specifically in the context of Vacco v. Quill and voluntary euthanasia. McIntyre believes that the difference between intentionality and foresight in cases of the doctrine of double effect shouldn't be rejected, but believes that most attempts to isolate the distinction merely lead to confusion.

References

21st-century American philosophers
American historians of philosophy
American women philosophers
Living people
Moral psychology
Philosophers of mind
Princeton University alumni
Wellesley College faculty
Tufts University alumni
Philosophers from Massachusetts
American women historians
Year of birth missing (living people)
21st-century American women